Ian Pringle (born 17 January 1953) is an Irish sprint canoeist who competed from the mid-1970s to the mid-1980s. He was eliminated in the repechages of both the K-2 1000 m and the K-4 1000 m events at the 1976 Summer Olympics in Montreal. Four years later in Moscow, Pringle was eliminated in the repechages of the K-1 1000 m event. At his third and final Summer Olympics in Los Angeles, he was eliminated in semifinals of both the K-1 500 m and the K-1 1000 m events.

References
Sports-Reference.com profile

1953 births
Canoeists at the 1976 Summer Olympics
Canoeists at the 1980 Summer Olympics
Canoeists at the 1984 Summer Olympics
Irish male canoeists
Living people
Olympic canoeists of Ireland